Amru Al-Qays is a crater on Mercury. The crater was first imaged by Mariner 10 in 1974.  Its name was adopted by the IAU in 1976, after the pre-Islamic Arab poet Imru' al-Qais in honor of his impact on astronomy and the world.

Amru Al-Qays is west of Nureyev crater, and both are located southeast of the Caloris basin in northern Tir Planitia.

Views

References

Impact craters on Mercury